Soucie is a village in Burkina Faso. Soucie may also refer to
Soucie (surname)
Sans Soucie, a compilation of non-album tracks by the American dream pop band Halou